Saint Thomas Choir School, founded in 1919, is a church-affiliated boarding choir school in Manhattan, New York. The school is supported by the nearby Saint Thomas Church (Episcopal), which, through its St. Thomas Choir of Men and Boys,
continues the Anglican tradition of all-male choral ensembles. The choir school is one of three world-wide that exclusively educate boy trebles of the choir, and require them to board at the school (Westminster Abbey Choir School in England and Escolania de Montserrat in Spain being the other two).

Students ranging from age 8 to 14 reside and study at the choir school, a 14-story building located at 202 West 58th Street in midtown Manhattan, one block south of Central Park. Since 2005, the school has offered a summer residential Girl Chorister Course.

History
Saint Thomas Choir School was founded in 1919 by the vestry of Saint Thomas Church at the urging of T. Tertius Noble, an English-born organist and composer, who had been the organist of Saint Thomas Church since 1913. The school officially opened on March 3, 1919 at its first location, a four-story building at 123 West 55th Street.

In 1985, the church sold the West 55th Street school to property developers Fisher Brothers, who in turn agreed to build a new choir school designed by the architecture firm Buttrick White & Burtis. The $18 million,  school building is clad with red brick on a granite base, with a central three-story window trimmed in Indiana limestone. It rises six stories "before stepping back twenty feet to an eight-story tower with a gabled roof that houses a chapel." The new school opened in September 1987.

Student life
Students participate in a liturgical music program while studying academic subjects such as English, science, history, mathematics, Latin, French, music theory, and theology. Students also participate in an athletic program, competing against local private schools in soccer, basketball, and track.

Students are admitted on a rolling basis. The school schedules auditions three times a year for boys entering the third, fourth, and fifth grade. Third grade students must live close enough to New York City to return home each weekend and return on Sunday evening, a requirement waived for fourth and fifth graders.

Other opportunities
The Choir School offers employment  to students taking a year out between high school and college. They assist in classroom and sports programs, and help in the preparation of the choristers’ instrumental practice. Most gap students have a choral background and an understanding of the daily routine and needs of a choir school. Acceptance is competitive.

Saint Thomas Choir
Currently (2022) directed by Jeremy Filsell, the choir performs regularly with the period instrument ensemble Concert Royal, and with the Orchestra of St. Luke's as part of its own concert
series. The  choir's primary raison d'être, however, is to provide music for five choral services each week at St. Thomas Church. Whereas the men of the Saint Thomas Choir are professional singers, the boy choristers are students of the Saint Thomas Choir School.

In addition to annual performances of Handel's Messiah, concerts at Saint Thomas Church have included
requiems by Fauré, Brahms, Mozart, Duruflé, and Howells; Bach's Passions and Mass in B Minor; the
Monteverdi Vespers of 1610; a Henry Purcell anniversary concert; Rachmaninoff Vespers; the U.S.
premiere of John Tavener's Mass; a concert of American composers featuring works by Leonard Bernstein and Aaron Copland; a composition by Saint Thomas chorister Daniel Castellanos; the world premiere of Scott
Eyerly's Spires; and a concert of works by Benjamin Britten.

The choir has toured throughout the U.S. and Europe, performing at Westminster Abbey and St. Paul's Cathedral in London; Kings College, Cambridge; Windsor; Edinburgh; St. Albans; and at the Aldeburgh Festival. In 2004, the choir toured Italy and performed at a Papal Mass at the Vatican. In 2007, the choir performed Bach's Saint Matthew Passion for the opening concert of the Mexico Festival in Mexico City as well as at Saint Thomas Church. In February 2012, the boys of the choir traveled to Dresden to give the premiere of Lera Auerbach's Dresden Requiem with the Dresden Staatskapelle at the Frauenkirche and at the Semperoper. Later in 2012, the choir performed in the Thomaskirche at the Bachfest Leipzig, a highlight of their tour to Germany and Copenhagen.

Head staff

Headmasters of the Choir School
Clarence Jack Smith, 1919
Raymond Wallace Gauger, 1920–1922
Herbert H. Hannan, 1923–1925
Clair J. Smith, 1926–1927
Charles Mead Benham, 1928–1942
The Rev. James O. Carson Jr, 1943–1944
Leon D. Phillips, 1945–1949
Henry B. Roney Jr, 1950–1955
Robert Porter, 1955–1966
Gordon H. Clem, 1967–1995
Murray Lawrence, 1995–1997
Gordon Roland-Adams, 1997–2004
The Rev. Charles Wallace, 2004-2019
Amalia Francisco (Interim), 2020-2021
Christopher Seeley, 2021-present

Organists and Choirmasters
T. Tertius Noble, 1913–1940
T. Frederick Candlyn, 1940–1954
William Self, 1954–1971
Gerre Hancock, 1971–2004

Organists and Directors of Music
John Scott, 2004–2015
Daniel Hyde, 2016–2019
Jeremy Filsell, 2019–present

Notable alumni 
Kit Culkin, actor
John Hine Mundy, British-American medievalist, professor at Columbia University
Steve Sandvoss, actor
Gunther Schuller, jazz and classical composer
Chris Wylde, actor

See also
Escolania de Montserrat, a boarding school for choristers in Spain 
Westminster Abbey Choir School, another school for choristers in England
Saint Thomas Church (Manhattan)

References

External links
Saint Thomas Choir School
Saint Thomas Church
Live webcasts of all choral services and further information, including recordings of the choir

Choir schools
Episcopal schools in the United States
Private middle schools in Manhattan
Private elementary schools in Manhattan
Educational institutions established in 1919
1919 establishments in New York City
Boys' schools in New York City
Buildings and structures in Manhattan
Postmodern architecture in New York City
Midtown Manhattan